A standardized test is a test administered and scored in a standard manner. The following are such tests as administered across the United States.

Ability/Achievement tests
Ability/ Achievement tests are used to evaluate a student's or worker's understanding, comprehension, knowledge and/or capability in a particular area. They are used in academics, professions and many other areas.

A general distinction is usually made between tests of ability/ aptitude (intelligence tests) versus tests of achievement (academic proficiency).

IQ tests
 Stanford–Binet Intelligence Scales (SB5)
 Wechsler Adult Intelligence Scale (WAIS)
 Wechsler Intelligence Scale for Children (WISC)
 Wechsler Preschool and Primary Scale of Intelligence (WPPSI)
 Otis–Lennon School Ability Test
 Differential Ability Scales (DAS)
 Woodcock–Johnson Tests of Cognitive Abilities (WJ)

Achievement tests
 Wechsler Individual Achievement Test (WIAT)
 Kaufman Test of Educational Achievement (KTEA)
 Woodcock–Johnson Tests of Achievement (WJ)
 Peabody Individual Achievement Test (PIAT-R)
 Wide Range Achievement Test, 5th Ed. (WRAT-5)

Public schools

 National Assessment of Educational Progress (NAEP)
 State achievement tests are standardized tests. These may be required in American public schools for the schools to receive federal funding, according to the US Public Law 107-110 originally passed as Elementary and Secondary Education Act of 1965, and currently authorized as Every Student Succeeds Act in 2015. No Child Left Behind was the controversial version of the law signed by President G. W. Bush in 2001; it was reauthorized in 2015 by President B. Obama.
 Exit examinations for high school graduation

Other tests
The test of General Educational Development (GED) 
and Test Assessing Secondary Completion TASC 
evaluate whether a person who has not received a high school diploma has academic skills at the level of a high school graduate.

Private tests are tests created by private institutions for various purposes, such as progress monitoring in K-12 classrooms.
 ACT
 PLAN
 EXPLORE
 California Achievement Test
 ITBS – Iowa Test of Basic Skills
 SAT – formerly Scholastic Aptitude Test
 SAT Subject Tests
 CLT – Classic Learning Test
 Former English Language Proficiency Test – ELPT
 PSAT/NMSQT – Preliminary SAT/National Merit Scholarship Qualifying Test
 STAR Early Literacy, STAR Math, and STAR Reading
 Stanford Achievement Test
 TerraNova
 WorkKeys

Admissions tests

Admissions tests are used in the admission process at elite or private elementary and secondary schools, as well as most colleges and universities. They are generally used to predict the likelihood of a student's success in an academic setting.

Secondary school
 ISEE – Independent School Entrance Examination
 SSAT – Secondary School Admission Test
 HSPT – High School Placement Test
 COOP – Cooperative admissions examination program
 SHSAT – Specialized High School Admissions Test

Undergraduate
 SAT – formerly Scholastic Aptitude Test
 SAT Subject Tests
 Former English Language Proficiency Test – ELPT
 ACT – formerly American College Testing Program or American College Test
 ACCUPLACER – community colleges and 4 year colleges placement test 
 CLT – Classic Learning Test

Graduate/professional schools
 Allied Health Professions Admission Test (AHPAT)
 Dental Admission Test (DAT) – (United States)
 Graduate Management Admission Test (GMAT) – (US)
 Graduate Record Examination (GRE) – (US and Canada)
 Law School Admission Test (LSAT) – (US and Canada)
 Miller Analogies Test (MAT)
 Medical College Admission Test (MCAT) – (US and Canada)
 Optometry Admission Test (OAT) – Optometry Admission Test
 Pharmacy College Admission Test (PCAT)
 Veterinary College Admission Test (VCAT) – no longer administered; American veterinary schools now use either the GRE or MCAT
 California Basic Educational Skills Test
 Wiesen Test of Mechanical Aptitude (WTMA)

Language proficiency
 TOEIC – Test of English for International Communication
 TOEFL – Test of English as a Foreign Language
 IELTS – International English Language Testing System

Psychological tests
 16 Personality Factors
 Achievement Motivation Inventory
 Beck Depression Inventory
 Millon Clinical Multiaxial Inventory
 Minnesota Multiphasic Personality Inventory (MMPI)
 Personality Assessment Inventory
 Myers–Briggs Type Indicator (MBTI)
 Revised NEO Personality Inventory
 Thematic Apperception Test

Professional certification tests
 Certified Public Accountant (CPA) for Accountants
 Chartered Financial Analyst (CFA)
 
 COMLEX-USA for osteopathic physicians
 Examination for Professional Practice in Psychology (EPPP), the most common certification for practitioners of Clinical Psychology in the U.S.
 Fundamentals of Engineering (FE), the first of two exams that must be passed to become a Professional Engineer
 General Securities Representative Examination, more commonly known as the Series 7 Exam, required to receive a license as a stockbroker in the U.S.
 Investment Company Products/Variable Life Contracts Representative Examination, more commonly known as the Series 6 Exam, for U.S. licensing to sell a limited set of securities such as mutual funds and variable life insurance
 Multistate Bar Examination (MBE), part of the bar examination in almost all United States jurisdictions
 Multistate Pharmacy Jurisprudence Examination (MPJE), a prerequisite for licensure as a pharmacist in the vast majority of U.S. jurisdictions
 Multistate Professional Responsibility Examination (MPRE), a requirement for bar admission in addition to the bar examination in almost all U.S. jurisdictions
 NAPLEX, required by all U.S. jurisdictions for licensure as a pharmacist
 NCLEX-PN for Licensed Practical Nurses
 NCLEX-RN for Registered Nurses
 Physician Assistant National Certifying Exam for physician assistants (PA)
 PRAXIS for Teacher certification
 Principles and Practice of Engineering Exam the second of the two exams someone must pass to become a Professional Engineer
 Uniform Certified Public Accountant Examination
 Uniform Combined State Law Examination, more commonly called the Series 66 Exam, required by some U.S. states for state certification as both a securities agent and investment adviser representative
 Uniform Securities Agent State Law Examination, more commonly known as the Series 63 Exam, required by almost all U.S. states for state certification as a securities agent
 United States Medical Licensing Examination for physicians (holders of either Doctor of Medicine or Doctor of Osteopathic Medicine degrees)
 USPTO registration examination, a requirement of the United States Patent and Trademark Office for registration as a patent attorney or agent

Armed Forces
ASVAB (United States) required for entry into any branch of The United States Military.
Other tests, such as AFOQT and ASTB are used for officers.

See also

 List of admissions tests
 Standards-based assessment

References

 
Standardized tests